Uda Pussellawa is a village in Sri Lanka. It is located in the Walapane Divisional Secretariat of Nuwara Eliya District in Central Province.

See also
List of towns in Central Province, Sri Lanka

External links

Populated places in Central Province, Sri Lanka